Oxycoleus obscurus is a species of beetle in the family Cerambycidae. It was described by Julio in 1997.

References

Cerambycinae
Beetles described in 1997